Parthian coinage was produced within the domains of the Parthian Empire (247 BC – 224 AD). The coins struck by the Parthians were mainly made of silver, with the main currencies being the drachm and tetradrachm. The tetradrachm, which generally weighed around 16 g, was only minted in Seleucia, first conquered by the Parthians in 141 BC. Design-wise, Parthian coinage was based on Seleucid and Achaemenid satrapal coinage.

See also
 Achaemenid coinage
 Sasanian coinage

References

Sources 
 
 
 
 
  
  
  
  
 
 
 

 
Parthian Empire
Ancient currencies